Gaudí (1991) is an album by the American ambient musician Robert Rich. It is a tribute to the Spanish architect Antoni Gaudí (June 25, 1852 – June 10, 1926). It is a stylistic mix of active tonal sequences and slower ambient pieces that Rich first explored in the mid-1980s when he recorded Geometry.

Track listing
 "Sagrada Família" – 4:24
 "Tracery" – 4:35
 "Silhouette" – 4:04
 "The Spiral Steps" – 9:46
 "Harmonic Clouds" – 8:49
 "Air" – 4:42
 "Serpent" – 6:27
 "Minaret" – 6:02
 "Mosaic" – 8:26

Personnel
Robert Rich – analog and digital synthesizers, samplers, lap steel guitar, bamboo and ceramic flutes, dumbek, Udu, talking drum, Waterphone, “glurp”
Pranesh Khan – tabla (track 2)

External links
Hearts of Space Records Album Page

Robert Rich (musician) albums
1991 albums
Hearts of Space Records albums